Night Partners is a 1983 American TV movie by director Noel Nosseck starring Yvette Mimieux and Diana Canova. It was based on a true story about a project to help victims of crime in Arizona.

References

External links
Night Partners at IMDb

1983 television films
1983 films
American television films